Accordionally Yours is an album by Walter Ostanek and His Band. In 1994, the album won Ostanek the Grammy Award for Best Polka Album.

Track listing
"Whoop Polka" – 2:45
"Singers & Players Polka" – 2:19
"Pretty Polly Polka" – 2:25
"I Never Knew Polka" – 2:25
"Emily's Waltz" – 2:39
"My Maria Polka" – 3:09
"You Are My Sunshine Polka" – 2:43
"I Knew from the Start Polka" – 2:48
"Clarinet Polka" – 2:28
"Please Leave Me Alone Waltz" – 2:39
"That Is Why Polka" – 2:24
"La Dee Da Oberek" – 3:06
"Kenny's Polka" – 2:37
"Lulubelle Polka" – 2:18

References

External links
Walter Ostanek Band's official site

Grammy Award for Best Polka Album
Polka albums